Comlux is an aviation company based in Switzerland, headquartered in Zürich. It provides services in the fields of aircraft operations, charter management, aircraft sales, acquisitions, maintenance, and upgrades.

Overview

Comlux Aviation
Comlux Aviation provides aircraft operations and management services to VIP customers. With 5 Airbus ACJ Family aircraft in the fleet, Comlux Aviation is the largest Airbus VIP operator worldwide. Comlux Aviation also operates one of the largest fleets of Bombardier business aircraft and since September 2011 it has operated a VIP Boeing 767BBJ available for charter. Comlux operates commercially under 4 AOCs: 9H Malta, P4 Aruba, UP Kazakhstan and T7 San Marino. Comlux Aviation commercial offices are located in Zürich, Moscow, Almaty and Hong Kong. OneAbove by Comlux provides VIP charter with the Comlux Aviation fleet and its networks of accredited worldwide operators. The aircraft are split worldwide including airline's operational bases at Malta International Airport, Almaty Airport, and Vnukovo International Airport.

Comlux Completion
Comlux Completion, located in Indianapolis, Indiana, is the completion center dedicated to large VIP aircraft cabins. The center is approved by Airbus, Boeing and Bombardier Inc. During the summer of 2012 Comlux Completion opened its new hangar facility at Indianapolis International Airport. Comlux is also a maintenance and refurbishment facility. It is approved to perform work on Airbus, Boeing, Bombardier and Gulfstream aircraft.

Comlux Transaction
Comlux Transaction team is based in Zürich and is in charge of purchasing, selling and leasing of VIP aircraft. The team has a network with the business aviation community and with financial institutions.

Fleet
As of September 2022, Comlux operates a fleet of several corporate and VIP configured aircraft of the following types:

1 Airbus A318CJ
2 Airbus A319CJ
1 Boeing 737-500
1 Boeing 767-200ER
1 Boeing 787-8
1 Bombardier Challenger 850
1 Bombardier Challenger 604
1 Embraer Legacy 650
1 Embraer Preator 600
1 Pilatus PC-24

In early 2015 it was announced that Comlux had ordered two Boeing 737 MAX 8 Business Jets. In February 2016 Comlux announced a new order for 3 ACJ320neo powered by CFM International Leap-1A engines.

Comlux Aruba

The Comlux Aruba fleet consists of the following aircraft (as of September 2022):
 1 Airbus A330-200
 1 Boeing 767-200ER
 1 Boeing 787-8

Comlux Kazakhstan

Comlux Kazakhstan (Comlux KZ) is a fully owned subsidiary of Comlux and operates charter and business flights out of its base of Almaty.

Current fleet
The Comlux Kazakhstan fleet consists of the following aircraft (as of September 2022):

Former fleet
The Comlux KZ fleet previously included the following aircraft types:
 1 Sukhoi Superjet 100-95SBJ

Comlux Malta

Current fleet
The Comlux Malta fleet consists of the following aircraft (as of September 2022):

Former fleet
The airline previously operated the following aircraft (as of August 2017):
 1 Airbus A330-200

References

Airlines of Switzerland
Airlines established in 2003
Swiss companies established in 2003